The Voluntary City: Choice, Community, and Civil Society is an Independent Institute-published book, edited by David T. Beito, about communities with private provision of municipal services. Contributors include Stephen Davies, Daniel B. Klein, Robert C. Arne, Bruce L. Benson, David G. Green, James Tooley, Fred E. Foldvary, Donald J. Boudreaux, Randall G. Holcombe, Robert H. Nelson, Spencer H. MacCallum, and Alexander Tabarrok. It covers the topics of privatized provision of urban infrastructure, roads, planning, police, charity, medical care, education, and commercial regulation, particularly through examination of historical examples of this provision.

Some criticisms of the book are that it does not adequately address situations such as the accident at Triangle Shirtwaist Factory, where private sector managers failed to install fire suppression equipment or leave the egresses unlocked (a common practice at the time), causing the death of around 146 employees; or the repressive nature of some private communities, including Pullman, Illinois. However, the book has also been praised for its bibliography, which has many useful resources on privatization. Among the examples the book gives of private communities are the private places of St. Louis and the Central Manufacturing District of Chicago.

See also
 Voluntary community

References

Books about urbanism
Anarcho-capitalist books
2002 non-fiction books